Papyrus 38 (in the Gregory-Aland numbering), designated by 𝔓38, is an early copy of part of the New Testament in Greek. It is a papyrus manuscript of the Acts of the Apostles, it contains only Acts 18:27-19:6.12-16. The manuscript paleographically has been assigned to the early 3rd century.

Although the text is quite short, the Greek text of this codex has been called a representative of the Western text-type. Aland named it as Free text and placed in Category IV. The text of this manuscript is related to Codex Bezae.

The manuscript was purchased in Cairo in 1924.

It is now in the University of Michigan (Inv. 1571) in Ann Arbor.

See also 
 Acts 18
 List of New Testament papyri

References

Further reading 
 Henry A. Sanders, A Papyrus Fragment of Acts in the Michigan Collection, Harvard Theological Review. vol. 20. 1927, pp. 1–19. 
 A. C. Clark, The Michigan Fragment of Acts, JTS XXIX (1927), pp. 18–28. 
 Silva New, The Michigan Papyrus Fragment 1571, in Beginnings of Christianity V (1933), pp. 262–268. 
 M.-J. Lagrange, Critique textuelle II, La Critique rationelle (Paris, 1935), pp. 402–405. 
 Henry A. Sanders, Michigan Papyri, University of Michigan Studies, Humanistic Series, XL (Ann Arbor, 1936), pp. 14–19.

New Testament papyri
4th-century biblical manuscripts
Acts of the Apostles papyri